The Adolfo Canyon Site (LA 5665) is an archaeological site containing a Navajo pueblito located in Rio Arriba County, New Mexico, United States. The site is situated on a rock outcrop overlooking Adolfo Canyon. The site consists of a three-room, single story pueblito, and extensive midden area, and six forked stick hogans on the crest of a ridge.

Excavation findings
Portions of the pueblito, hogans, and trash area have been excavated. Dinetah Gray and Gobernador Polychrome ceramic sherds were recovered during the excavations. One sherd of Puname Polychrome from the Keresan pueblos was also found. No European trade goods were found during the excavation.

Tree-ring dates obtained from the hogans range from 1733vv to 1751v.

See also

National Register of Historic Places listings in Rio Arriba County, New Mexico

References

Navajo history
Archaeological sites on the National Register of Historic Places in New Mexico
Bureau of Land Management areas in New Mexico
Geography of Rio Arriba County, New Mexico
Ruins in the United States
Buildings and structures in Rio Arriba County, New Mexico
National Register of Historic Places in Rio Arriba County, New Mexico